Sir William Glynne, 2nd Baronet (17 May 1663 – 3 September 1721) was a Welsh lawyer and politician.

The elder son of Sir William Glynne, 1st Baronet (whom he succeeded in 1690), he was educated at St Edmund Hall, Oxford.

He was a Gentleman of the privy chamber from 1691 to 1702. He was Member of Parliament for Oxford University from 1698 until 1701 and then represented the borough of Woodstock from 1702 until 1705. He was awarded a D.C.L. from Oxford in 1706 and was appointed High Sheriff of Oxfordshire for 1706–7.

On 5 July 1688, Glynne married Mary Evelyn, daughter of Sir Edward Evelyn, 1st Baronet of Long Ditton. They had two children:
William Glynne (1698–1719), a Fellow of All Souls College, Oxford
Mary Glynne

Predeceased by his only son, he was succeeded on his death in 1721 by his brother Stephen.

References

Further reading

1663 births
1721 deaths
Baronets in the Baronetage of England
Members of the pre-1707 Parliament of England for the University of Oxford
Alumni of St Edmund Hall, Oxford
Gentlemen of the Privy Chamber
English MPs 1698–1700
English MPs 1701
English MPs 1702–1705
High Sheriffs of Oxfordshire